Novak Electronics, Inc. of Irvine, California, United States was a manufacturer RC electronics.

Founded by RC enthusiast and electronics engineer Bob Novak and originally a manufacturer of servos, Novak is primarily known for its line of electronic speed controls for electric land vehicles and boats.

The companies' product line has expanded in recent years to include:

 Battery chargers 
 Synthesized receivers
 Transmitter modules
 Power supplies
 Brushless motor systems
 Brushless-specific batteries and dischargers

Novak's 35,000 square foot/3252 square meter robotic manufacturing facility makes it one of the few American electronics manufacturers to design, build and test its own products onsite with its combination of degreed engineers and experienced RC racers.

From January 2014, the company became Novak R/C and Bob split ownership to his daughters Linda Novak Logan, Laura Novak-Roesgen and Adnan Khan, its Engineering Director. Novak R/C later announced a partnership with Hobbico and Great Planes.

Its "Team Novak" racing division has won 20 IFMAR World Champion titles.

Prior to its closure, it was the last manufacturer to manufacture and produce its radio-controlled products in the United States

After 38 years, the company announced it was closing.

References

Radio-controlled cars
Electronics companies of the United States
Manufacturing companies based in Greater Los Angeles
Companies based in Irvine, California
2016 establishments in California
2016 establishments in the United States
Manufacturing companies established in 2016
Electronics companies established in 2016
American companies established in 2016